Abiodun Akande (born 10 December 1993 in Ibadan, Oyo State) is a Nigerian football goalkeeper who plays for Plateau United. He has played for Shooting Stars F.C., Sunshine Stars F.C., Rivers United. In 2021, he started playing for Plateau United till now.

Career 
Abiodun Akande began his professional career with Shooting Stars F.C. during the 2010 season. After signing as a youth player following 2009 Nigeria Football Federation Cup state qualification level in 2010 when Shooting Stars played against Oppy STars FC. he was signed in 2009 to the senior team but held to be with the Team B, after few weeks, he was promoted to the first team and started making an integral part in helping the Oluyole Warriors compete in the Nigeria Premier League. During the season, he integrated well into the team forming a vital partnership with teammates providing numerous assists and clean sheets in vital games. One of his respected goalkeeper trainer who impacted greatly to his career is former  Sunshine Stars F.C. Coach Daramola Nicholas Akinsehinwa between the year 2015 to 2016 during his playing time with Sunshine Stars F.C.

Shooting Stars F.C (2010-2015)
Handed his home debut against perennial rivals Warri wolves FC in Ibadan 2010 Nigeria Premier League Season. Abiodun was named the NPFL best Youngest goalkeeper of the year at the end of his first season (2010, 2011,2012) and also won the best Goalkeeper in the Nigeria National League 2014 that got Shooting Stars FC promoted back to the Nigeria Premier League.

International 
He has played for Nigeria U-17, Nigeria U-20 and Nigeria U-23

References 

Akande Abiodun Profile- African Football
Heroic Goalkeeper - nan news nigeria
Heroic Goalkeeper salvages away point for 3SC - the eagles online

External links
 https://web.archive.org/web/20150421063047/http://www.nannewsnigeria.com/node/47202
 https://web.archive.org/web/20150527112837/http://sportsdayonline.com/3sc-shoot-down-pillars/
 https://web.archive.org/web/20150508180146/http://dailyindependentnig.com/2015/05/3sc-compounds-pillars-woes/ 
 https://web.archive.org/web/20160304083333/http://www.futaa.com/football/article/npfl-akande-named-hero-in-3sc-loss

1993 births
Living people
Sportspeople from Ibadan
Nigerian footballers
Nigeria under-20 international footballers
Nigerian expatriate footballers
Association football goalkeepers
Yoruba sportspeople
Karamone F.C. players
Sunshine Stars F.C. players
Expatriate footballers in Nigeria